Morad El Haddouti (born 9 May 1998) is a Dutch professional footballer who plays as a forward.

NEC
El Haddouti started playing football at CSV Oranje Blauw and VV Union and played in the youth academy of NEC between 2010 and 2014. In 2014–15 season, he played in the youth academy of the De Graafschap. In 2015 he rejoined NEC. He made his professional debut on 18 January 2019 against SC Telstar, the game ended in 1-1.

El Haddouti's contract with NEC was not extended and he left the club at the end of the 2019–20 season. He then joined RKC Waalwijk, where he was registered for the club reserve team. El Haddouti made his debut on 17 September 2019 for Jong RKC, where he came in to the second half and scored two goals. He made his first-team debut for the club on 13 September 2020 in a 0–1 home loss to Vitesse. He came on as an 82nd minute substitute for Lennerd Daneels.

References

External links
 

1998 births
Living people
Footballers from Nijmegen
Association football forwards
Dutch footballers
Netherlands youth international footballers
NEC Nijmegen players
RKC Waalwijk players
Eerste Divisie players
Eredivisie players
Dutch sportspeople of Moroccan descent